Sport in China refers to the exercise of sport activities in the People's Republic of China. It may also refer to:

Sport in Hong Kong
Sport in Macau
Sport in Taiwan (Republic of China)